Bilateral relations between Cambodia and Thailand date to the 13th century during the Angkor Era. The Thai Ayutthaya Kingdom gradually displaced the declining Khmer Empire from the 14th century, importing much of its customs and culture. French protectorateship separated Cambodia from modern Thailand at the turn of the 19th–20th centuries, and diplomatic relations between the modern states were established on 19 December 1950.

Relations between the two countries remain complicated. Incomplete demarcation of their boundaries has led to a protracted border conflict, most notably over the temple of Preah Vihear, which was brought to the International Court of Justice in 1962 but still saw military clashes emerge in 2008 and 2011. Cambodia's internal conflicts throughout the 1970s to 1980s often spilled over into Thailand, which received refugees but also gave indirect support to the Khmer Rouge. Thailand now dominates over its poorer neighbour economically, and is the sixth largest investor in Cambodia. Though relations are largely peaceful, the countries' peoples still bear a degree of enmity, which has erupted into violence when stoked by nationalist sentiments. Such episodes include a mob attack on the Thai Embassy in Phnom Penh in 2003, which prompted a downgrading of relations by Thailand. Thailand also downgraded relations in 2009 in response to the Cambodian government's support of former Thai Prime Minister Thaksin Shinawatra, while Cambodia terminated relations (represented by its embassy in Bangkok) twice in 1958 and 1961, during the Preah Vihear conflict.

History

Angkorian Era
 

Following Jayavarman VII's death, the Khmer Empire experienced a gradual decline. Important factors were the neighboring peoples (Thai and Cham), chronic interdynastic strife, and the gradual deterioration of the complex irrigation system that had ensured rice surpluses. During the 13th century, Thai people began to rise up, Jayavarman VIII suffered a devastating war against the Sukhothai Kingdom led by Si Inthrathit. The Angkorian monarchy survived until 1431, when the Thai under Borommarachathirat II, captured Angkor Thom and the Cambodian king fled to the southern part of the country.

Longvek Era

The Thai conquest of the new capital at Lovek in 1594 marked a downturn in the country's fortunes and Cambodia. Becoming a pawn in power struggles between its two increasingly powerful neighbors, Siam and Vietnam. Vietnam's settlement of the Mekong Delta led to its annexation of that area at the end of the 17th century. Vietnamese pioneers employed a strategy of settle and claim. Such foreign encroachments continued through the first half of the 19th century. A successful invasion by Vietnam further limited Thai protectorship in Cambodia and established the kingdom under full Vietnamese suzerainty.

French Protectorate of Cambodia
To prevent the two neighbors, Siam and Vietnam, from swallowing Cambodia, King Norodom invited France to make Cambodia its protectorate, on 11 August 1863. Cambodia remained under France's rule until 9 November 1953.

Cold War
During the 1970s, Khmer Rouge ruled Cambodia as Democratic Kampuchea carrying out the Cambodian genocide. This caused many Cambodian refugees fleeing to the Thai border to escape Pol Pot's regime.

On 1 January 1979, Vietnam invaded Kampuchea and removed Khmer Rouge from power replacing it with the Soviet-backed People's Republic of Kampuchea escalating into an eleven year war. Thailand refused to recognize the PRK and continued to support the deposed Democratic Kampuchea though Khmer Rouge and the two non-communist factions assembled the Kampuchean government-in-exile backed by the People's Republic of China, North Korea, ASEAN and the other Western powers. During that period, the Vietnamese soldiers attacked refugee camps near the Thai-Cambodian border over the course of its annual dry seasons.

By the time Communist regimes in Eastern Europe collapsed, Vietnam withdrew its troops from Cambodia in late 1989 leading up to the 1991 Paris Peace Accords which paved way for the restoration of monarchy in 1993.

Conflicts and disputes

2003 riots

In January 2003, riots broke out in Phnom Penh after a Cambodian newspaper incorrectly reported that a Thai actress had stated Angkor Wat properly belonged to Thailand. On 29 January, the Thai embassy was burned, and hundreds of Thai immigrants fled the country to avoid the violence. Cambodians in Phnom Penh burned photos of King Bhumibol Adulyadej and Thais in Bangkok protested in front of the Cambodian embassy, burning Cambodian flags. This eventually led to the Thai government to sever diplomatic ties with Cambodia. Prime Minister Hun Sen banned Thai shows and films on TV stations.

2008 border disputes

The conflict between Cambodia and Thailand over land adjoining the site has led to periodic outbreaks of violence.

 
A military clash occurred in October 2008. In April 2009, 66 stones at the temple allegedly were damaged by Thai soldiers firing across the border. In February 2010, the Cambodian government filed a formal letter of complaint with Google Maps for depicting the natural watershed as the international border instead of the line shown on the 1907 French map used by the International Court of Justice in 1962.

In February 2011, when Thai officials were in Cambodia negotiating the dispute, Thai and Cambodian troops clashed, resulting in injuries and deaths on both sides.  Artillery bombardment in the area occurred during the conflict.  The Cambodian government has claimed that damage occurred to the temple.  However, a UNESCO mission to the site to determine the extent of the damage indicates that the destruction is a result of both Cambodian and Thai gunfire.

Both sides shelled the other, and both blame the other for starting the violence. On 5 February 2011, Cambodia formally complained in a letter to the UN "The recent Thai military actions violate the 1991 Paris Peace Accord, U.N. Charter and a 1962 judgment from the International Court of Justice", the letter claims. On 6 February, the Cambodian government claimed that the temple had been damaged. Cambodia's military commander said: "A wing of our Preah Vihear temple has collapsed as a direct result of the Thai artillery bombardment". However, Thai sources spoke only of minor damage, claiming that Cambodian soldiers had fired from within the temple.

ASEAN, to which both states belong, offered to mediate the issue. However, Thailand has insisted that bilateral discussions could better solve the issue. On 5 February, the right-wing People's Alliance for Democracy called for the resignation of Prime Minister Abhisit Vejjajiva for "failing to defend the nation's sovereignty".

An UNESCO World Heritage convention held in Paris in June 2011 determined to accept Cambodia's management proposal for the temple. As a consequence, Thailand withdrew from the event, with the Thai representative explaining, "We withdraw to say we do not accept any decision from this meeting."

Following a February 2011 request from Cambodia for Thai military forces to be ordered out of the area, judges of the International Court of Justice (ICJ) by a vote of 11–5 ordered that both countries immediately withdraw their military forces, and further imposed restrictions on their police forces. The court said this order would not prejudice any final ruling on where the border in the area between Thailand and Cambodia should fall. Abhisit Vejjajiva said that Thai soldiers would not pull out from the disputed area until the military of both countries agreed on the mutual withdrawal. "[I]t depends on the two sides to come together and talk," he said, suggesting that an existing joint border committee would be the appropriate place to plan a coordinated pullback. The ICJ ruled on 11 November 2013 that the area around and below the temple belongs to Cambodia and that any Thai security forces still in that area must leave.

See also

 Cambodia–Thailand border
 Cambodian–Thai border dispute
 Foreign relations of Cambodia
 Foreign relations of Thailand

References

 
Thailand
Bilateral relations of Thailand
Relations of colonizer and former colony